Paolo Maria Nocera (born July 25, 1985 in Rome) is an Italian former racing driver.

Career

Formula Renault
Nocera began his car racing career by driving in the Italian Formula Renault Championship in 2003; also competing in one race of the Eurocup Formula Renault 2.0. For 2004 he stayed in the Italian series, but only finished twentieth in the drivers' championship in both this and the previous year.

Formula Three
Nocera first raced in the Italian Formula Three Championship in 2004. Staying with the Lucidi Motors team throughout his time in this formula, he finished thirteenth overall in his first year and improved to third place in the standings in 2005. Following an unsuccessful foray into the Formula Three Euroseries in 2006, Nocera returned to Italy for 2007 and won the F3 championship at his third attempt.

Formula 3000
In 2006, Nocera also drove in the Euroseries 3000 for Formula One driver Giancarlo Fisichella's team. He finished thirteenth in the drivers' championship.

GP2 Series
Nocera was recruited by the BCN Competicion team to drive for them in the 2008 GP2 Series season. However, he was released after one round of the championship in favour of Adrián Vallés, who had himself been replaced at Fisichella's GP2 team by Adam Carroll.

Formula Renault 3.5 Series
It was announced on August 25, 2008, that Nocera had signed for RC Motorsport in the Formula Renault 3.5 Series, replacing British driver Duncan Tappy who had encountered budget problems. After a further two rounds of the championship, Tappy returned to the seat, and Nocera has not raced since.

Racing record

Career summary

Complete GP2 Series results
(key) (Races in bold indicate pole position) (Races in italics indicate fastest lap)

Complete Formula Renault 3.5 Series results
(key) (Races in bold indicate pole position) (Races in italics indicate fastest lap)

References
Career statistics from driverdb.com. Retrieved on May 9, 2008.

1985 births
Living people
Italian racing drivers
GP2 Series drivers
Italian Formula Renault 2.0 drivers
Formula Renault Eurocup drivers
Italian Formula Three Championship drivers
Auto GP drivers
Formula 3 Euro Series drivers
World Series Formula V8 3.5 drivers
Prema Powerteam drivers
Cram Competition drivers
RP Motorsport drivers
RC Motorsport drivers
Scuderia Coloni drivers